Joanne Ellis (born 10 November 1983 in Leeds, West Yorkshire) is an English field hockey international, who was a member of the England and Great Britain women's field hockey team since 2006. She is not to be confused with another English field hockey player named Joanne Ellis. She started her hockey career at Royston hockey club.

References

    Profile

External links
 

Champions Trophy Sydney 2009

1983 births
English female field hockey players
Living people
Sportspeople from Leeds
Olympic field hockey players of Great Britain
British female field hockey players
Field hockey players at the 2008 Summer Olympics